Playing with Death is a 1995 Iranian detective movie filmed in Iran and Turkey and produced by Alireza Zarif of 'IRIB Television'.

Cast
Abdolreza Akbari 
Ahmad Fakhr
Mohammad Barsozian
Hamid Tamjidi
Hassan Shirzad
Asqar Mohebi
Larisa Tamjidi
Cüneyt Arkın
Salih Kırmızı
Berrin Topaloğlu
Bülent Polat
Nazan Saatci

External links
 Kasra Films 

Officer Mohammadi who thinks his daughter is got killed by a smuggling gang finds out that she is alive and is taken as a hostage in Turkey. He goes there to rescue her but has to face many challenges in saving her.

1990s Persian-language films
1995 crime drama films
1995 films
Films shot in Turkey
Iranian crime films